Coal City is a village in Grundy and Will Counties in the U.S. state of Illinois. It is considered a fringe town of the Chicago metropolitan area. The population was 5,587 at the 2010 census. It is served by Interstate 55. The Santa Fe Railway formerly served Coal City at Coal City Station.

History
Coal City was incorporated in 1870, named for coal mines in the vicinity that were built following the 1820 discovery of large coal reserves. During the 20th century, coal mining operations in the area declined, with the local economy being driven more by growth in manufacturing and the construction of nearby power plants, including Dresden Nuclear Power Plant and Braidwood Nuclear Generating Station.

2013 tornado
A tornado passed through Coal City damaging a number of homes during the tornado outbreak of November 17, 2013. The National Weather Service rated the tornado an EF2. The max wind speed was rated at 122 miles per hour, with a reported path length of 12.9 miles. 3 injuries would be recorded.

2015 tornado
A confirmed EF3 tornado passed through Coal City during the outbreak of storms and tornadoes on Monday, June 22, 2015.  The tornado touched down near Morris, Illinois, before entering Coal City, damaging and destroying a number of homes and businesses. According to the National Weather Service, winds reached 160 miles per hour as the tornado touched down, making it the most powerful tornado to hit the region since the Plainfield, IL tornado in August 1990.

Geography

Demographics

As of the census of 2000, there were 4,798 people, 1,872 households, and 1,306 families residing in the village. The racial makeup of the village was 98.46% White, 0.13% African American, 0.25% Native American, 0.02% Asian, 0.02% Pacific Islander, 0.54% from other races, and 0.58% from two or more races. Hispanic or Latino of any race were 1.90% of the population.

There were 1,871 households, out of which 36.1% had children under the age of 18 living with them, 57.2% were married couples living together, 9.1% had a female householder with no husband present, and 30.2% were non-families. 26.0% of all households were made up of individuals, and 11.4% had someone living alone who was 65 years of age or older. The average household size was 2.56, and the average family size was 3.10.

In the village, the population was spread out, with 27.5% under the age of 18, 8.3% from 18 to 24, 32.2% from 25 to 44, 19.4% from 45 to 64, and 12.6% who were 65 years of age or older. The median age was 34 years. For every 100 females there were 95.6 males. For every 100 females age 18 and over, there were 95.1 males.

The median income for a household in the village was $51,921, and the median income for a family was $65,509. Males had a median income of $47,368 versus $27,476 for females. The per capita income for the village was $23,662. About 1.5% of families and 3.1% of the population were below the poverty line, including 1.7% of those under age 18 and 9.7% of those age 65 or over.

Education 
Coal City is served by Unit School District 1. There are five schools and a unit office in the school district. The Coal City Early Childhood Center services grades PK through 1st. The Coal City Elementary School services grades 2 and 3.  The Coal City Intermediate School serves grades 4 and 5. Coal City Middle School has grades 6-8. Coal City High School has grades 9-12.

Coal City is the home of the Coal City High School 2010 IHSA State Champion Softball team. Coal City also won a state championship in football in 1993.

Notable people 

 John R. Fronek, member of the Wisconsin State Assembly and farmer; lived in Coal City
 William E. Somerville, early aviation engineer, businessman and mayor.

References in popular culture
The little town of Coal City was mentioned in the classic comedy The Blues Brothers. Elwood Blues (as played by Dan Aykroyd) explains that his brother Jake (John Belushi) was in prison for holding up a gas station, and then says "He pulled that job to pay for the band's room service tab from that Kiwanis gig in Coal City."

For years residents of Coal City wondered if Aykroyd really said "Coal City" or said "Cal City" (a nickname for Calumet City, a much bigger city in Illinois). However, when watching the DVD of Blues Brothers with subtitles on, the text says "Coal City."

The Steve Martin and John Candy comedy, Planes, Trains & Automobiles, was partially filmed in Coal City and other nearby towns.

References

External links
 Village of Coal City

Villages in Grundy County, Illinois
Villages in Will County, Illinois